Waithaka is a metropolitan settlement in Nairobi. It borders near Mutuini.

Waithaka Ward is also an electoral division within Dagoretti South Constituency. The whole constituency is within Dagoretti Sub-county.

References

 

Suburbs of Nairobi
Populated places in Nairobi Province